Apoy sa Dagat (International title: Raging Love / ) is a 2013 Philippine melodrama romantic suspense television series directed by FM Reyes and Nick Olanka, starring Angelica Panganiban in her first dual role, together with Piolo Pascual and Diether Ocampo. The series was aired on ABS-CBN's Primetime Bida evening block from February 11, 2013, to July 5, 2013, replacing Kahit Puso'y Masugatan, and was replaced by Muling Buksan ang Puso on its timeslot.

Synopsis 
The story is a riveting tale of a woman named Serena (Angelica Panganiban) who grew up with no memory about her real identity and why she was swept off to an island. With no family to hold on to, Serena finds and forms a special bond with Ruben (Piolo Pascual), the fishing village's roguish champion, whom she will eventually fall in love with.

Just when everything seems perfect, an unfortunate accident will suddenly test Serena's love for Ruben. How far will Serena go just to save the life of the only man she loves? What is Anton's (Diether Ocampo) relevance in Serena's life? And the biggest question is, who is Rebecca (Angelica Panganiban), and how will she affect the lives of Ruben, Anton and Serena?

Cast and characters

Main cast 
 Angelica Panganiban as Serena Mirasol / Rosanna V. del Sol & Rebecca V. del Sol 
 Piolo Pascual as Ruben Manubat
 Diether Ocampo as Antonio "Anton" Lamayre
 Angel Aquino as Adrianna Lamayre
 Aiko Melendez as Odessa Villarosa-del Sol

Supporting cast 
 Liza Lorena as Ildelfonsa del Sol
 Freddie Webb as Manolo Lamayre
 Perla Bautista as Lornita Mirasol
 Sylvia Sanchez as Callixta "Tessie" Caballero
 Ricardo Cepeda as Benedict "BDM" D. Manubat 
 Eric Fructuoso as Tristan Corpuz / Theodoro Balitaan
 Iya Villania as Helena Redentor
 Melai Cantiveros as Paprika "Pops" Mendoza
 Regine Angeles as Kara Cruz
 Bryan Santos as Liam "Orwell" Manubat

Recurring cast 
 Zeppi Borromeo as Balong
 Moi Bien as Piper
 Natasha Cabrera as Flor
 Rico Barrera as Lando
 Alizon Andres as Tomas

Guest cast
 Mikylla Ramirez as Stephanie Lamayre
 Wendy Valdez as Bernadette Lamayre
 Jamilla Obispo as Mildred Balitaan
 Arnold Reyes as Zandro Ricaforte†
 Fred Payawan as Clive Sta. Maria
 Justin Cuyugan as Sebastian Lobregat
 Yayo Aguila as Dolores Manubat
 Idda Yaneza as Meding
 Crispin Pineda as Juancho
 Joshua Dionisio as teen Liam/Orwell
 Menggie Cobarrubias
 Justin Gonzales

Special participation 
 Empress Schuck as young Adrianna
 Nikki Gil as young Odessa
 Patrick Garcia as Alberto del Sol
 Isabel Rivas as young Ildelfonsa
 Sharmaine Suarez as young Lornita
 Christian Vasquez as young Manolo
 Kalila Aguilos as Suzanna Lamayre
 Manuel Chua as young Benedict
 Kitkat as young Tessie
 Devon Seron as young Bernadette
 Jong Cuenco as Miguel del Sol
 RJ Padilla as young Anton
 Lance Angelo Lucido as young Liam
 Nathaniel Britt as young Ruben
 Veyda Inoval as young Rosanna/Serena and Rebecca

Soundtrack 
 Kailangan Kita - Angeline Quinto
 Anong Nangyari Sa Ating Dalawa - Aiza Seguerra
 I Will Never Leave You - Erik Santos
 If You Ever Change Your Mind - Marion Aunor
 Kastilyong Buhangin - Piolo Pascual
 Kailangan Kita - Jed Madela

Production 
The initial premiere of Apoy Sa Dagat was originally February 4, 2013, replacing Kahit Puso'y Masugatan. It was later postponed and moved to February 11, 2013.

Ratings

See also 
List of programs broadcast by ABS-CBN
List of dramas of ABS-CBN

References

External links
 

ABS-CBN drama series
2013 Philippine television series debuts
2013 Philippine television series endings
Philippine melodrama television series
Philippine thriller television series
Television series by Star Creatives
Philippine romance television series
Filipino-language television shows
Television shows set in the Philippines